Miolyncina is an extinct genus of sea snail, a cowry, a marine gastropod mollusk in the family Cypraeidae, the cowries.

Fossil record
Fossils of Miolyncina  are found in marine strata from the Eocene to the Pliocene (age range: from 48.6 to 2.588 million years ago.). Fossils are known from Italy, France, India, Pakistan, Poland and Sri Lanka.

Species
 †Miolyncina cocconii Mayer-Eymar 1875
 †Miolyncina conjungens Sacco 1894
 †Miolyncina prevostina Grateloup 1847

References

Cypraeidae